Amiriyeh (also Romanized as Amīrīyeh; also known as Chāh-e Kalleh-ye Bālā (Persian: چاه كله بالا) and Amīrīyeh-ye Qaţār Boneh) is a village in Sharifabad Rural District, in the Central District of Sirjan County, Kerman Province, Iran. At the 2006 census, its population was 61, in 14 families.

References 

Populated places in Sirjan County